Taklong Island is the main island of the Taklong Island National Marine Reserve located in Nueva Valencia, Guimaras, off the southern end of the island of Guimaras, in the West Visayas of the Philippines. A marine  biological station run by the University of the Philippines Visayas (UPV) of nearby Iloilo Province is found in this island. The one-storey Station established in 1977 and renovated twice (in 1987 and in 2008) sits on a 1.64 hectares parcel of land donated to UP in 1964, with Carlos P. Romulo as then University President. Donors included the family of the first Lieutenant Governor of then SubProvince of Guimaras, the late Antonio Ortiz. When proclaimed as a national marine reserve in Feb. 8, 1990 by then President Corazon C. Aquino, there was only one family residing in the island, the family of Vicente Basco, the only recognized tenured migrant when Taklong Island became part of the national marine reserve. Mr. Basco  was employed by UPV as caretaker of its Station in Taklong Island since the 1970s until his retirement. There are  UPV staff, including security guards stationed in the island. 

Takong Island was affected by the Guimaras Oil Spill of 2006, but has fully recovered.

External links
 
 Taklong Island at OpenStreetMap

Islands of Guimaras